This is a list of flag bearers who have represented Chad at the Olympics.

Flag bearers carry the national flag of their country at the opening ceremony of the Olympic Games.

See also
Chad at the Olympics

References

Chad at the Olympics
Chad
Olympic flagbearers
Olympics